The Department of Medical Microbiology, formerly known as the Department of Bacteriology or the Institute of Bacteriology, was a research department of the pharmaceutical company Schering AG.

History
It was established in 1893, and its first director was Hans Aronson. It was initially located in an old factory building in Charlottenburg which had been only slightly modernized. The institute's 60 horses, whose blood was used in serum research, were in rented stables. Under Aronson's leadership, the institute developed one of the first successful commercially produced antitoxic antisera against diphtheria, in direct competition with Emil von Behring, which was claimed by Schering to be much more effective than Behring's serum. The use of diphtheria antitoxin for the treatment of diphtheria was regarded by The Lancet as the "most important advance of the [19th] Century in the medical treatment of acute infectious disease." The Aronson Prize is named in Aronson's honour.

In the 1920s the institute expanded significantly and took over the entire Schering complex in Charlottenburg, as the other Schering departments were moved to other facilities. The Department of Bacteriology remained in Charlottenburg due to the stables and laboratories being located there. During the Cold War the department moved to Schering's headquarters in Wedding (Müllerstraße 170–172). Georg Henneberg, the institute's former director, became President of the Federal Health Agency in 1969.

As a result of Schering's 2006 merger with Bayer, the former department was integrated in Bayer HealthCare Pharmaceuticals.

Directors
Dr.med. Hans Aronson (1893–1909)
Dr.med.vet. Anton Marxer (1909–)
Dr.med. Georg Henneberg (1940–45)
Dr.med. Herbert Millberger (1950s)
Dr.med. A.K.W. Kutzsche (1959–1965)
Dr.med. Mahmoud K. Muftić (late 1960s)

References

Literature
Paul Korn: Geschichte der Bakteriologischen Abteilung der Schering AG 1893–1942

Schering AG
Medical research institutes in Germany
1893 establishments in Germany
Medical and health organisations based in Berlin